= Duck's head =

Chinese poultry snack

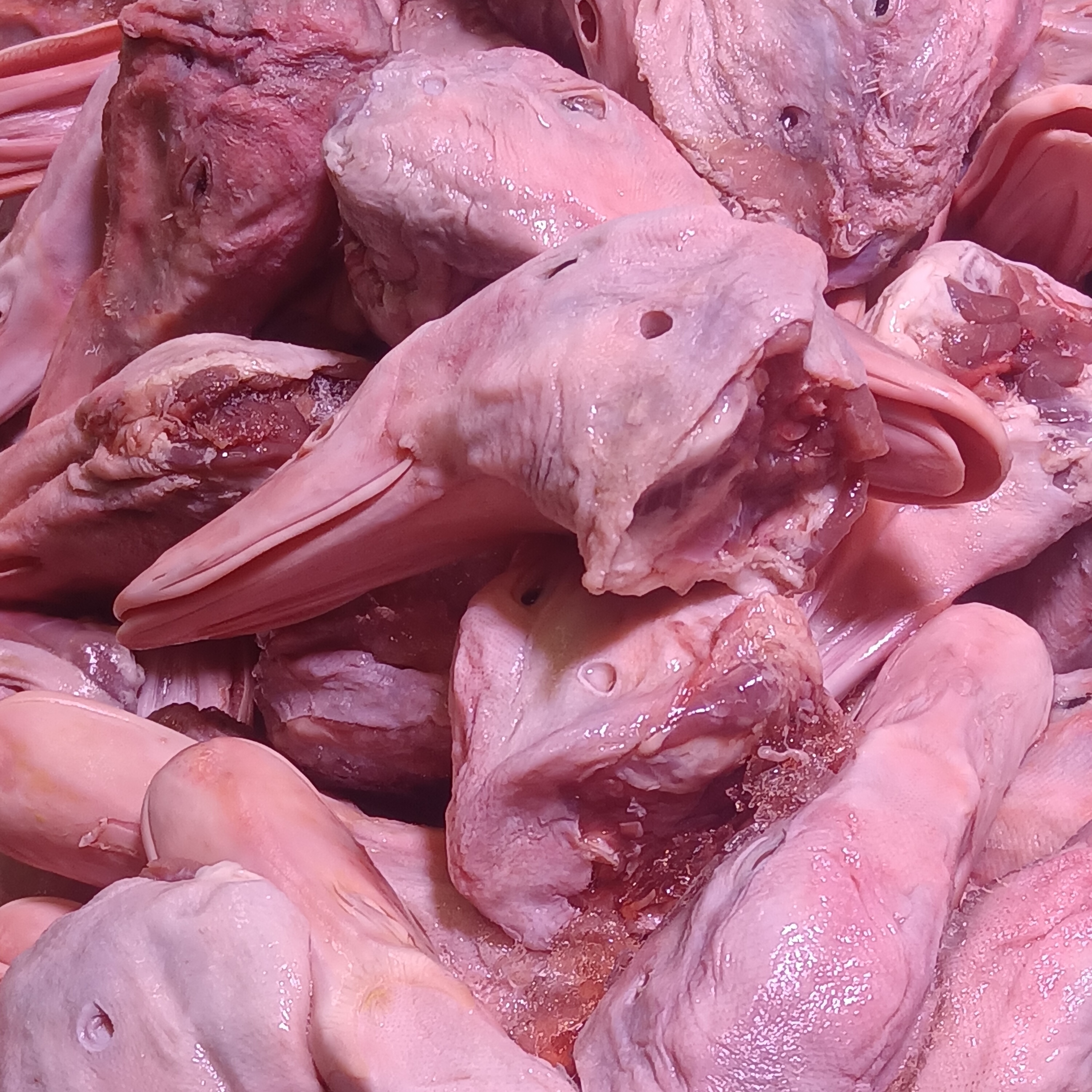
Butchered duck heads before being cooked

Duck's head (simplified Chinese: 鸭头; traditional Chinese: 鴨頭) is a Chinese snack made by adding spices and herbs to a stir-fried head of duck. It is a popular dish in many parts of China, including Wuhan and Shanghai. One duck's head store claims that the snack "helps your own brain power". It has a crispy taste and is written to be a healthy food with no known health drawbacks. Kellie Schmitt of CNN describes duck's head as one of "Shanghai's weirdest foods".

== History ==
Duck's head is not a modern invention; one specialty restaurant, Dongshan Duck's Head (Chinese: 东山鸭头), has been around for generations.

== Preparation and description ==
According to Pang Xijing, who is the owner of a Wuhan-based duck's head eating establishment, the snack is prepared by first leaving frozen duck heads under running water for some three hundred and sixty minutes, before stir-frying the heads with some herbs and spices. The Shanghai-based Jiu Jiu Ya makes duck's head by stewing the heads "in a potent mix of 30 Chinese herbs and barley rice". Duck's head is described to have a crispy taste – a result of the stir-frying.

== Consumption and nutritional value ==
The bulk of duck's head is not digestible; only the skin is eaten, while the rest of the snack is just gnawed by consumers. It can be accompanied by alcoholic liquids like beer.

== Cultural impact ==
Kellie Schmitt of CNN calls duck's head one of "Shanghai's weirdest foods". One duck's head store claims that the snack "helps your own brain power".
